Karthikayil Padmanabhan Appan (25 August 1936 – 15 December 2008), better known as K. P. Appan, was a renowned literary critic in Malayalam. Born in Alappuzha (Alleppey), Kerala, Appan worked as a Professor of Malayalam literature at SN College, Kollam, Kerala.

Biography
Karthikayil Padmanabhan Appan was born to Poonthoppil Padmanabhan and Karthiyani in Alappuzha on 25 August 1936. He had his schooling at Sanadana Dharma Vidyalaya there and graduation at SD College, Alappuzha. He took his post-graduation from Maharaja's College, Ernakulam. Appan began his career as a high school teacher and then joined UC College, Aluva, as a lecturer in Malayalam. Later he joined SN College, Cherthala, and then got transferred to SN College, Kollam, in 1972. He retired from there in 1992.

Appan died at a private hospital in Kayamkulam on 15 December 2008, aged 72. He had been battling with cancer for almost three years.

Writing

He introduced modern European and Eastern literary visions in Malayalam literary criticism. Some of his works were Kshobhikkunnavarude Suvisesham (1972), Thiraskaram (1978), Kalahavum Viswasavum (1984), Marunna Malayala Novel (1988), Kalapam, Vivadam, Vilayiruthal (1992) Malayala Bhavana Mullyangalum Sangharshangalum (1992), Bible Velichathinte Kavacham (1994), Penayude Samaramukhangal (1995), Samayapravahavum Sahithyakalayum (1996), Abhimukha Sambashanangal (1997), UtharadhunikathaVarthamanavum Vamsavaliyum (1997).

Awards and honors
In 2008, K. P. Appan won the Kendra Sahithya Academy Award for his collection of essays in Malayalam, Madhuram Ninte Jeevitham. The award was announced after his death.

References

Further reading

External links 
 

1936 births
Indian literary critics
Malayalam-language writers
Writers from Alappuzha
Malayalam literary critics
2008 deaths
Recipients of the Sahitya Akademi Award in Malayalam
Maharaja's College, Ernakulam alumni
Malayalam novelists
20th-century Indian novelists
Novelists from Kerala